Nitocrella slovenica is a species of harpacticoid copepod in the family Ameiridae.

The IUCN conservation status of Nitocrella slovenica is "VU", vulnerable. The species faces a high risk of endangerment in the medium term. The IUCN status was reviewed in 1996.

References

Harpacticoida
Articles created by Qbugbot
Crustaceans described in 1959
IUCN Red List vulnerable species